Harmony Hill High School was a catholic girls boarding school in Watertown, South Dakota. It was built in 1967 and operated as a high school until 1974. From 1972 to 1995 the building was used for adult education. The building was demolished in 1997 to build the current Mother of God Monastery.

References 

Private high schools in South Dakota
Schools in Codington County, South Dakota
Catholic secondary schools in the United States
1967 establishments in South Dakota
Buildings and structures in Watertown, South Dakota
Demolished buildings and structures in South Dakota
Buildings and structures demolished in 1997